"Shake Your Pants" is a 1980 single by the R&B/funk band Cameo from the 1980 album, Cameosis.  It was also released as a single where it peaked at number eight on the Hot Soul Singles chart "Shake Your Pants" has since been re-released on many of the band's greatest hits albums, including one named after the song.

Chart positions

References

Cameo (band) songs
Songs written by Larry Blackmon